Erica baccans, the berry heath, is a species of Erica that was naturally restricted to the city of Cape Town, South Africa.

It is endemic to Table Mountain, usually found on the lower parts of Peninsula Sandstone Fynbos. It is becoming increasingly popular as an ornamental plant in Cape Town gardens.

The species is naturalised in parts of Australia where it colonises disturbed sites.

See also
Peninsula Sandstone Fynbos
Biodiversity of Cape Town

References

baccans
Flora of the Cape Provinces
Taxa named by Carl Linnaeus